Stephen B. H. Kent (December 12, 1945 in Wellington, New Zealand) is a chemistry professor at the University of Chicago. While professor at the Scripps Research Institute in the early 1990s he pioneered modern ligation methods for the total chemical synthesis of proteins.  He was the inventor of native chemical ligation together with his student Philip Dawson . His laboratory experimentally demonstrated the principle that chemical synthesis of a protein's polypeptide chain using mirror-image amino acids after folding results in a mirror-image protein molecule which, if an enzyme, will catalyze a chemical reaction with mirror-image stereospecificity. At the University of Chicago Kent and his junior colleagues pioneered the elucidation of protein structures by quasi-racemic & racemic crystallography.

Biography 
Dr. Kent received his  Chemistry Ph.D. from the University of California, Berkeley in 1975, his M.Sc. from Massey University, Palmerston North, New Zealand in 1970,  and his B.Sc. degree in 1968 from Victoria University of Wellington, New Zealand.

Following his post-doctoral work in the laboratory of Robert Bruce Merrifield at the Rockefeller University, Dr. Kent continued research there as an assistant professor through 1981. He has also held faculty positions at the California Institute of Technology, Bond University in Australia, and the Scripps Research Institute in California. Currently Dr. Kent is Professor in the Department of Biochemistry & Molecular Biology and Professor of Chemistry at the University of Chicago. From 2003-2009 he served as Director of the Institute for Biophysical Dynamics. In addition to his academic achievements, in the 1990s he was the founder of two San Francisco Bay Area companies: Ciphergen Biosytems and Gryphon Sciences.

Dr. Kent has received international recognition for his research achievements. In 1994 he received the Ralph F. Hirschmann Award in Peptide Chemistry from the American Chemical Society , the inaugural Kaiser Award from the Protein Society in 2002, the du Vigneaud Award from the American Peptide Society (2004), the 2009 Merrifield award from the American Peptide Society, the Rudinger Medal from the European Peptide Society (2010), the Akabori Medal from the Japanese Peptide Society (2010), the Alfred Bader Award in Bioorganic Chemistry (2011) from the American Chemical Society, the Leach Medal from the Lorne Protein Conference (2013), the Prelog Medal for stereochemistry from the ETH Zurich (2017), and the inaugural Ernesto Scoffone Award from the Italian Peptide Society (2018). Dr. Kent is an Honorary Fellow of the Royal Society of New Zealand. He was elected Fellow of the American Association for the Advancement of Science in 2000, and Fellow of the Royal Society of Chemistry in 2008. 

In May 2016 the Journal of Peptide Science, edited by Luis Moroder, published a Festschrift in celebration of his 70th birthday.

References

Further reading

External links

Festschrift

21st-century American chemists
1945 births
Living people